The rohu, rui, ruhi or roho labeo (Labeo rohita) is a species of fish of the carp family, found in rivers in South Asia. It is a large omnivore and extensively used in aquaculture.

Description
The rohu is a large, silver-colored fish of typical cyprinid shape, with a conspicuously arched head.

Distribution and habitat
The rohu occurs in rivers throughout much of northern and central and eastern India, Pakistan, Vietnam, Bangladesh, Nepal and Myanmar, and has been introduced into some of the rivers of Peninsular India and Sri Lanka.

Ecology
The species is an omnivore with specific food preferences at different life stages. During the early stages of its lifecycle, it eats mainly zooplankton, but as it grows, it eats more and more phytoplankton, and as a juvenile or adult is a herbivorous column feeder, eating mainly phytoplankton and submerged vegetation. It has modified, thin hair-like gill rakers, suggesting that it feeds by sieving the water.

Rohu reach sexual maturity between two and five years of age. They generally spawn during the monsoon season, keeping to the middle of flooded rivers above tidal reach. The spawning season of rohu generally coincides with the southwest monsoon. Spawn may be collected from rivers and reared in tanks and lakes.

Aquaculture
The rohu is an important aquacultured freshwater species in South Asia. When cultured, it does not breed in lake ecosystems, so induced spawning is necessary. The rohu is also prized as a game fish.

Preparation as food
Rohu is very commonly eaten in Bangladesh, Nepal, Pakistan and the Indian states of Tripura, Nagaland, Bihar, Odisha, Assam, West Bengal,  Andhra Pradesh, Tamilnadu and Uttar Pradesh.
A recipe for fried Rohu fish is mentioned in Manasollasa, a 12th-century Sanskrit encyclopedia compiled by Someshvara III, who ruled from present-day Karnataka. In this recipe, the fish is marinated in asafoetida and salt after being skinned. It is then dipped in turmeric mixed in water before being fried.

Rohu caught in Mithila are known as Mithila Rohu Machh (Maithili: मिथिला रोहु माछ) and considered tastier than the Rohu varieties found in the coastal areas. The Bihar State government is currently making efforts to establish a List of geographical indications in India (GI) tag for the fish.

Nutrition 

Rohu is rich in Omega 3 fatty acids, Vitamin A, Vitamin B and Vitamin C. It is also rich in Vitamin D, a Vitamin which is present only in a few foods and consumption of the fish will prevent Osteoporosis, a Vitamin D deficiency disease.

References

Cyprinid fish of Asia
Fish of Thailand
Fish described in 1822
Labeoninae
Fish of Bangladesh